The events of the Equestrian at the 2007 Southeast Asian Games the dressage and show jumping events were held at the Horseshoe Point, Pattaya, Chon Buri Province, Thailand and eventing event were held at the Thai Polo Club, Pattaya, Chon Buri Province, Thailand

Medal tally

Medalists

External links
Southeast Asian Games Official Results

2007 Southeast Asian Games events
2007
2007 in equestrian
Equestrian sports competitions in Thailand